"What Can I Do If the Fire Goes Out?" is a song by Australian alternative rock band, Gang of Youths, released on 10 February 2017 as the lead single from their second studio album, Go Farther in Lightness (August 2017). It reached No. 13 on the ARIA Hitseekers Singles Chart. It was listed at number 10 on the Triple J Hottest 100, 2017. The song was certified platinum by ARIA.

Music video

The music video was released on 20 April 2017.

Track listings

Certifications

References

2017 singles
2016 songs
Gang of Youths songs